Andrei Vladimirovich Kharabara (born 1 September 1985) is a Russian former professional footballer.

Honours
Aktobe
Kazakhstan Super Cup (1): 2014

References

1985 births
Living people
Russian footballers
Russian expatriate footballers
FC Tobol players
FC Kairat players
FC Aktobe players
FC Zhetysu players
Kazakhstan Premier League players
Expatriate footballers in Kazakhstan
Russian expatriate sportspeople in Kazakhstan
Association football midfielders
FC Neftekhimik Nizhnekamsk players
Sportspeople from Chernivtsi Oblast